"Runnin' Back to Saskatoon" is a song written by Burton Cummings and Kurt Winter.

The song was recorded by the Canadian rock group The Guess Who on May 22, 1972, for the album Live at the Paramount and is also included on their 1974 album The Best of the Guess Who, Vol. 2.

The single release spent three weeks on the Billboard Hot 100 peaking at #96 during the week of October 28, 1972. The song reached #9 in Canada. The band never recorded a studio version of the song and the hit single version is the live recording from May 22, 1972, which was edited/shortened from 6m24s to 3m27s for AM radio airplay.

Places mentioned in the song are Saskatoon, Moose Jaw, and Moosomin, which are all in Saskatchewan, as well as three cities in Alberta — Red Deer, Medicine Hat and Hanna, one in British Columbia — Terrace, and Hong Kong.

The song was covered by Pearl Jam at the Credit Union Centre in Saskatoon, Saskatchewan on September 7, 2005, and then again on September 19, 2011, during their PJ20 Anniversary tour.  Eddie Vedder admittedly messed up the lyrics to the song during the first run through of the song in the performance.  In order to redeem the band and appeal to the Saskatoon crowd, the band played the song once more before the end of the concert.  This time, they invited a fan from the crowd to sing the correct lyrics.

Burton Cummings released "Running Back to Saskatoon" in October 2012 on the album Massey Hall, recorded live in Toronto at Massey Hall, backed by his band The Carpet Frogs. The album contains many Guess Who and solo hits from his career.

References

1972 songs
1972 singles
Live singles
Songs written by Burton Cummings
Songs written by Kurt Winter
The Guess Who songs
Song recordings produced by Jack Richardson (record producer)
RCA Victor singles
Songs about Canada
Culture of Saskatoon